is a passenger railway station located in Tama-ku, Kawasaki, Kanagawa Prefecture, Japan, operated by the East Japan Railway Company (JR East).

Lines
Shukugawara Station is served by the Nambu Line. The station is  the southern terminus of the line at Kawasaki Station.

Station layout
The station consists of two opposed side platforms serving two tracks, connected by a footbridge. The station is staffed.

Platforms

History
Shukugawara Station was opened on 9 March 1927 as a station on the Nambu Railway. The Nambu Railway was nationalized on 1 April 1944 becoming part of the Japanese Government Railways, and the station came under the control of the Japan National Railways (JNR) from 1949. Freight operations were discontinued after 1955. After the privatization of the JNR on 1 April 1987, the station was absorbed into the JR East network.

Passenger statistics
In fiscal 2019, the station was used by an average of 8,266 passengers daily (boarding passengers only).

The passenger figures (boarding passengers only) for previous years are as shown below.

Surrounding area
Fujiko F Fujio Museum

See also
List of railway stations in Japan

See also
 List of railway stations in Japan

References

External links

  

Railway stations in Kanagawa Prefecture
Railway stations in Japan opened in 1927
Railway stations in Kawasaki, Kanagawa